This is a list of articles about years in the Palestinian territories.

See also
 List of years in Mandatory Palestine
 List of years in Israel
 Timeline of the history of the region of Palestine

 
year
year